Awbono is a Papuan language spoken in the highlands of Papua Province, Indonesia. All that is known of Awbono is a few hundred words recorded in first-contact situations recorded in Wilbrink (2004) and Hischier (2006).

An Awbono word list from Jacky Menanti is published in Wilbrink (2004).

Densar, which is poorly attested, may be closely related.

References

Bayono–Awbono languages